Beaucens (Occitan: Biussens) is a commune in the Hautes-Pyrénées department in the Occitanie region of south-western France.

The inhabitants of the commune are known as Beaucinois or Beaucinoises.

Geography
Beaucens is located in the Pyrénées National Park some 10 km south of Lourdes and 30 km south of Tarbes. Access to the commune is by the D913 from Préchac in the north which passes through the west of the commune and the village and continues south to join the D921 south-east of Soulom. The D13 goes north from the village to Ayros-Arbouix. Apart from the village there are the hamlets of Vielle, Gézat, and Nouillan. Most of the commune is rugged and inaccessible with some farmland in the west and forests south-east of the village. The Hautacam Ski resort is located in the centre of the commune

The Gave du Pau Ou du Lavedan flows through the west of the commune from south to north forming the Lac des Gaves before continuing north to become the Gave de Pau north of the commune. The Ruisseau des Bariquėres rises in the west of the commune and flows east to join the Gave du Pau Ou du Lavedan west of the village. The Ruisseau d'Estibos rises in the east of the commune and forms part of the north-eastern border before continuing west to join the Gave du Pau Ou du Lavedan. The Ruisseau d'Isaby flows east from the Lac d'Isaby forming part of the south-eastern border of the commune as it flows south-west to join the Gave de Gavarnie Ou de Pau at Soulom.

The commune is bordered by eight other communes (see table).

Toponymy

Historical  names

Belsen, (around 870, Livre vert de Bénac, around 980, ibid;. 1050–1070, Cartulary of Saint-Savin; 1168, Papal bull of Pope Alexander III).
Beusen, (1285, Montre Bigorre; 1300, Enquête Bigorre; 1313 Debita regi Navarre;).
de Beucennio, Latin (1379 procuration of Tarbes).
Beucen, Beussen, Beusen (1429 Censier de Bigorre).
Beaussen, Beaucen, (1614, Guillaume Mauran).
Beaucen en Lavedan, (1737-1779, parish records).
Beucen, (1768, Duco).
Beaucen, (1790, Department 1 and 2).

Beaucens appears as Beaucen on the 1750 Cassini Map and the same on the 1790 version.

Heraldry

Administration

List of Successive Mayors

Demography
In 2017 the commune had 409 inhabitants.

Culture and heritage

Civil heritage
The commune has two buildings and sites that are registered as historical monuments:
The Manor of Cohitte (1692)
The Chateau of Beaucens (ruins) (14th century) is a former castle of the Viscounts of Lavedan. The site was transformed into a zoo, the Keep of Eagles, where there are birds of prey flying around the ruins of the castle with a view of the Gaves valley.

Religious heritage
The Church of Saint Vincent contains two items that are registered as historical objects:
An Altar table (12th century)
The Notre-Dame-de-Bedouret Statue (14th century)

See also
Communes of the Hautes-Pyrénées department

References

Communes of Hautes-Pyrénées